Anthony Suau is an American photojournalist and documentary filmmaker, based in New York City.

Life and work
Suau was born in Peoria, Illinois. He worked for the Chicago Sun-Times, and The Denver Post, was a contract photographer for Time from 1991 to 2009, and has produced a number of stories for National Geographic magazine. He has dedicated his life and career to documenting the effects of international events on the lives of people around the world.

Suau has published five books, including Beyond the Fall, a ten-year photography project portraying the transition of the Eastern bloc starting from the fall of the Berlin Wall, and Fear This, with American journalist and author Chris Hedges and blurbs by Howard Zinn and P. J. O'Rourke, about the war of images and slogans being played out in the US whilst the country was at war in Iraq.

His work has appeared in National Geographic, Paris Match, Stern, The New York Times Magazine, The Sunday Times Magazine, Life, and elsewhere.

In 2009 he co-founded the nonprofit collective "Facing Change: Documenting America", with a group of socially-minded photographers and writers to document the issues facing the United States during a time of economic uncertainty. As the project president he was able to negotiate and sign agreements with the Library of Congress, Leica Camera, National Geographic, GEO, Le Monde, Open Society Foundations, and PhotoShelter. Six months after a negligent board of directors took control of the company's management, in June 2013, he resigned from the organization to work on a number of developing projects.

Suau directed his first feature documentary, Organic Rising, which examines the rise of the organic farming movement across the American agricultural landscape. The film's executive producer is Deepak Chopra, the production company is Goldcrest Films. Elizabeth Kucinich, the wife of former U.S. Congressman Dennis Kucinich, also is a producer on the film. The film was slated for release in 2019.

Publications
 On a Deux Yeux de Trop: Avec les Réfugiés Rwandais, Goma, Zaïre, 1994. Arles, France: Actes Sud, 1995. . On the genocide in Rwanda.
 Dans les Montagnes où Vivent les Aigles: Grozny, Tchétchénie, Janvier 1995. Arles, France: Actes Sud, 1995. . On the war in Chechnya.
 Beyond the Fall: The Former Soviet Bloc in Transition, 1989-99. Network Photographers, 2000. .
 Fear This: A Nation at War. New York: Aperture, 2004. .

Awards
 1984: Pulitzer Prize for Feature Photography for his photographs of the famine in Ethiopia 
 1987: World Press Photo of the Year, from World Press Photo, Amsterdam, for a photograph taken during a demonstration in South Korea 
 1995: Robert Capa Gold Medal for his photographs from Chechnya 
 2008: World Press Photo of the Year for a photograph taken in Cleveland, Ohio, depicting an officer securing a home under foreclosure at gun-point 
 2008: Infinity Award from the International Center of Photography, New York City 
 2010: Emmy, 31st News & Documentary Emmy Awards, New Approaches to News and Documentary Programming: Arts, Lifestyle and Culture category, for a web documentary on his images taken during the fall of the Berlin Wall in November 1989

References

External links
 
 Organic Rising film
 "The Iconic Photo of the Berlin Wall" – six-minute documentary video

1956 births
Living people
American photographers
Pulitzer Prize for Feature Photography winners
Rochester Institute of Technology alumni